is a Japanese magical girl anime television series created by Takahiro, produced by Studio Gokumi and directed by Seiji Kishi as part of a media project called Takahiro IV Project. The series aired in Japan between October 17 and December 26, 2014 on MBS. The anime has been licensed by Pony Canyon's North American label Ponycan USA. Multiple light novel and manga series have been published by ASCII Media Works. A PlayStation Vita video game was released in Japan in February 2015. A visual novel for Windows was released in December 2014 with the first DVD and Blu-ray Disc volume for the anime, with a second released with the sixth volume in May 2015. A second anime season project, consisting of an adaptation of a prequel light novel and a sequel series, ran between March 2017 and January 2018. A smartphone game launched in 2017 and received a short anime series titled Yuki Yuna is a Hero: Churutto!, which aired between April to June 2021. A third anime season aired between October to December 2021.

Plot
Using a special phone application granted by Taisha, an organization dedicated to the Shinju, Yuna and her friends must transform into "heroes" with magical powers to protect their world from imminent destruction.

Characters

Sanshu Middle School Hero Club

A second-year in middle school and member of the Hero Club. She prides herself on being a hero, helping out others in need and always remaining optimistic. She uses armored fists for powerful close-range combat during her hero form and has a cow-like familiar named  who, unlike the other familiars, likes to roam freely; she later gets another, cat-like familiar named . As a result of using her Mankai form, she loses her sense of taste. Later, she uses the Mankai form for a second time and loses the use of her legs. Having fallen into a coma due to her efforts, she regains consciousness after Mimori's voice reaches her, as actually her soul was out of her body in a black hole-like realm. She soon recovers and regains her sense of taste and the ability to walk.

 

Yūna's best friend and fellow classmate and club member who lives next door to her and often prefers to be called by her family name. Mimori takes pride in her national heritage and is always ready to defend her country and protect its people. She had lost the use of her legs, along with some of her memories, allegedly due to a car accident. In her hero form, she uses guns and sniping rifles for long-range combat and her ribbons serve as appendages for moving around. Later, she gets another familiar named . As a result of using her Mankai form, she loses her hearing in her left ear. Like the rest of her Hero Club friends, she recovers after the events of the final episode and regains her memory and the ability to walk.

Prior to the events of the series, she was adopted under the name of Sumi Washio and fought alongside her elementary school classmates Sonoko and Gin. She originally used a bow and arrow in her hero form but later upgraded to a silver rifle. The loss of her legs and memory were actually a result of her using Mankai twice, after which she was returned to her original family and relocated next to Yūna due to her high affinity. Upon meeting Sonoko again, she learns both the truth about the Hero System and the true nature of Shinju.

A third-year in middle school and the president of the Hero Club. She is the older sister of Itsuki, who she has been looking after following the death of their parents. She is knowledgeable about Shinju and the Vertex and was the one who gave her fellow members the app needed to fight against the Vertex. Later she gets another familiar named . As a result of using her Mankai form, she loses vision in her left eye, but regains it back after the events of the final episode. It is also revealed that her parents were killed by Vertex, and as such her original motivation for fighting Vertex was for revenge. Details about the exact situation of her parents' death were not given.

A first-year in middle school and member of the Hero Club. She is Fū's younger sister and respects her dearly. Later, she gets another familiar named . As a result of using her Mankai form, she loses her voice, but regains it after the events of the final episode.

An experienced, but somewhat stubborn hero who transfers into Yūna and Mimori's class and joins the Hero Club to supervise the other heroes. In episode 11, as a result of using Mankai four times, she loses the use of her right arm, right leg, her hearing and vision, but later regains them after the events of the final episode.

Mimori's classmate during elementary school who first appears in Washio Sumi wa Yūsha de Aru and uses a large trident in her hero form. She nicknamed Mimori "Wasshī". As a result of using Mankai twenty times, she loses the use of most of her limbs and becomes unable to move, and afterwards is put in direct supervision of Taisha as a trump card. She later appears in the anime series, where she informs Yūna and Mimori about the truth behind the Hero System. After the events of the final episode, she is shown to have regained her lost body functions and later joins the Hero Club.

Other heroes

Mimori and Sonoko's classmate during elementary school who appears in Washio Sumi is a Hero and uses a pair of large blades in her hero form. She dies protecting Mimori and Sonoko, prompting Taisha to change the Hero System, implementing fairies and Mankai. Her terminal is eventually passed onto Karin.

Sonoko's predecessor and one of the first heroes chosen to fight against the Vertex, who fought using a lance.

One of the first heroes who fought alongside Wakaba using a shield. She was killed attempting to protect Anzu from the Vertex. 

One of the first heroes who fought alongside Wakaba using a crossbow. She, alongside Tamako, was killed by the Vertex.

One of the first heroes who fought alongside Wakaba, using a scythe and cloning magic. Overcome with stress from public backlash against the heroes and her feelings for Yuna, she was stripped of her powers as a result of attempting to kill Wakaba, leading to her being killed by Vertex and officially disregarded as a hero by Taisha. 

One of the first heroes who fought alongside Wakaba with her fists, possessing unknown ties to the present Yuna Yuki. 

Wakaba's friend and an oracle working for Taisha who received visions of the future.

Exo-barrier Special Investigations Fleet

A hero candidate who lost to Karin and instead became a member of the ESIF.

Media

Print
A prequel light novel titled , written by Takahiro and illustrated by Bunbun, was serialized in ASCII Media Works' Dengeki G's Magazine between April 30, 2014 and November 29, 2014. The novel takes place two years before the anime's time frame, and follows the previous Hero team before Yūna's. Another light novel series, titled , written by Aoi Akashiro and illustrated by Bunbun, began serialization in Dengeki G's Magazine on July 30, 2015. Nogi Wakaba takes place 300 years before the anime's time frame during the first Vertex attack on the world. It follows Sonoko Nogi's ancestor, Wakaba Nogi as its protagonist and the first Shikoku hero team consisting of her, Hinata Uesato, Yūna Takashima, Chikage Kōri, Tamako Doi and Anzu Iyojima. Another light novel written by Akashiro, Kusunoki Mebuki wa Yūsha de Aru, began serialization in Dengeki G's Magazine on June 30, 2017. It takes place after the anime's first season and before Hero Chapter, and follows a different team of Heroes.

A manga adaptation of Washio Sumi wa Yūsha de Aru, illustrated by Mottsun*, began serialization in ASCII Media Works' Dengeki G's Comic from June 30, 2014. A manga titled , written by Takahiro and illustrated by Kotamaru, began serialization in Dengeki G's Magazine from July 30, 2014. The first volume of a third manga, titled Yūki Yūna wa Yūsha de Aru and illustrated by Tōko Kanno, was released on November 27, 2014. Yūki Yūna wa Yūsha de Aru later started serialization in Dengeki G's Comic on December 26, 2014.

Anime

The first 12-episode anime television series was produced by Studio Gokumi and directed by Seiji Kishi. Planned by Takahiro, the anime's screenplay was written by Makoto Uezu, and the character design was provided by Takahiro Sakai. The series aired in Japan on MBS from October 17 to December 26, 2014 and was simulcast by Crunchyroll. The anime was licensed in North America by Pony Canyon's label for the region, Ponycan USA, which released the series with an English dub on DVD and Blu-ray on April 10, 2015.

The Washio Sumi Chapter was first released as three theatrical films between March 18 and July 8, 2017 before airing as six television episodes between October 7 and November 11, 2017, followed by a recap of the first season which aired on November 18, 2017. Hero Chapter, which consists of six television episodes, aired between November 25, 2017 and January 6, 2018. Both parts were simulcast in North America by Anime Strike. Three short films produced by W-Toon Studio, based on the spin-off manga, Yūki Yūna wa Yūsha-bu Shozoku, were screened alongside each The Washio Sumi Chapter film.

A short anime based on the Yūki Yūna wa Yūsha de Aru Hanayui no Kirameki smartphone game, titled Yuki Yuna is a Hero: Churutto!, was announced on May 26, 2020. The series is directed by Seiya Miyajima at DMM.futureworks and W-Toon Studio. Miyajima is designing the characters, while Haruka is overseeing the scripts, and Monaca is composing the series' music. It aired from April 10 to June 26, 2021 on the Super Animeism block on MBS and TBS.

A third anime season titled  was announced, with the main staff and cast members reprising their roles. It consists of adaptations of the Kusunoki Mebuki wa Yūsha de Aru and Nogi Wakaba wa Yūsha de Aru light novels, followed by an expanded retelling of the ending of Hero Chapter with new scenes and a new epilogue. It aired from October 2 to December 18, 2021 on MBS, TBS, and their affiliates.

Video games
Two visual novels for Windows, developed by Minato Soft and featuring scenarios written by Takahiro and Osamu Murata, are bundled with the first and sixth DVD and Blu-ray Disc volumes of the anime series released on December 17, 2014 and May 20, 2015, respectively. Each visual novel features ten different scenarios original to the game and is fully voiced by the original cast. The graphics are handled by Studio Gokumi. An action video game developed by FuRyu titled  was released on February 26, 2015 for the PlayStation Vita.

A crossover mobile game titled , or YuYuYui for short, was released on June 8, 2017 for iOS and Android. It featured characters, including those from manga and light novels, alongside new characters in the mobile game. It also included various non-canon stories, such as stories of Yuki Yuna, Washio Sumi, Nogi Wakaba, Kusunoki Mebuki, Fuyo Yuna, Akamine Yuna; collaborations with Release the Spyce: Secret Fragrance, Katana Maidens: Toji No Miko, one of Studio Gokumi’s shows, A Certain Scientific Railgun T and Symphogear. The game ended service on iOS and Android devices on October 28, 2022.

On October 8, 2022, Entergram announced that Bouquet of Brilliance was in the process of being ported to consoles.

Reception
The first Japanese Blu-ray volume opened as the week's eight best selling animation Blu-ray, with 4,781 copies, and remained on the sales charts for an additional four weeks, selling 10,373 copies in total. Each volume of the series has charted highly on Oricon list. Volume five charted at No. 1 on sales list, with 6,422 copies, whereas the sixth and final volume placed second, with 7,626 copies. Yuki Yuna is a Hero was the 15th-best selling animation BD in Japan of 2015's half yearly sales list, having earned 58,961 copies in total.

The first film ranked No. 1 on the mini-theater rankings in Japan. The second film also ranked No. 1 on the mini-theater rankings when it was released, outselling the first film.

References

External links

 
Yūki Yūna wa Yūsha de Aru: Jukai no Kioku official website 
Yūki Yūna wa Yūsha de Aru: Hanayui no Kirameki official website 

2014 anime television series debuts
2014 Japanese novels
2015 Japanese novels
2015 video games
2017 anime television series debuts
2017 anime films
2017 Japanese novels
2021 anime television series debuts
Action-adventure games
Action video games
Anime Strike
Anime with original screenplays
Animeism
ASCII Media Works manga
Child superheroes
Dark fantasy anime and manga
Dengeki G's Magazine
Fantasy video games
Fiction about monsters
Films with screenplays by Makoto Uezu
Japan-exclusive video games
Kadokawa Dwango franchises
Light novels
Television about magic
Magical girl anime and manga
Works about mobile phones
PlayStation Vita games
PlayStation Vita-only games
Role-playing video games
School life in anime and manga
Seinen manga
Studio Gokumi
Video games developed in Japan
Visual novels
Windows games
Yonkoma